Sofia Pelekouda (born 22 September 1994) is a Greek football defender currently playing for Amazones Dramas.

External links 
 

1994 births
Living people
Women's association football defenders
Greek women's footballers
Greece women's international footballers